Nontronite is the iron(III) rich member of the smectite group of clay minerals.  Nontronites typically have a chemical composition consisting of more than ~30% Fe2O3 and less than ~12% Al2O3 (ignited basis). Nontronite has very few economic deposits like montmorillonite. Like montmorillonite, nontronite can have variable amounts of adsorbed water associated with the interlayer surfaces and the exchange cations.

A typical structural formula for nontronite is Ca.5(Si7Al.8Fe.2)(Fe3.5Al.4Mg.1)O20(OH)4.  The dioctahedral sheet of nontronite is composed mainly of trivalent iron (Fe3+) cations, although some substitution by trivalent aluminium (Al3+) and divalent magnesium (Mg2+) does occur. The tetrahedral sheet is composed mainly of silicon (Si4+), but can have substantial (about 1 in 8) substitution of either Fe3+ or Al3+, or combinations of these two cations. Thus, nontronite typically is characterised by having most (usually greater than 60%) of the layer charge located in the tetrahedral sheet. The layer charge is typically balanced by divalent calcium (Ca2+) or magnesium (Mg2+).

Nontronite forms from the weathering of biotite and basalts, precipitation of iron and silicon rich hydrothermal fluids and in deep sea hydrothermal vents.  Some evidence suggests that microorganisms may play an important role in their formation. Microorganisms are also involved in reduction of structural iron in nontronite when soils undergo anoxia, and the reduced form of the clay appears to be highly reactive towards certain pollutants, perhaps contributing to the destruction of these compounds in the environment.

The only known commercially viable and operational nontronite mine is located in Canterbury, New Zealand. The mine is operated by Palmer Resources and the finished products are used internationally in industrial applications (pulp & paper, surface coating) and in cosmetics marketed as New Zealand Glacial Clay.

See also

References

Smectite group
Clay minerals group
Monoclinic minerals
Minerals in space group 12